Bahrām Beyzāêi (also spelt Beizāi, Beyzāêi, ; born 26 December 1938) is an Iranian playwright, theatre director, screenwriter, film editor, and ostād ("master") of Persian letters, arts and Iranian studies.

Beyzaie is the son of the poet Ne'matallah Beyzai (best known by his literary pseudonym "Zokā'i"). The celebrated poet Adib Beyzai, known as one of the most profound poets of 20th-century Iran, is Bahram's paternal uncle. Bahram Beyzaie's paternal grandfather, Mirzā Mohammad-Rezā Ārāni ("Ebn Ruh"), and paternal great-grandfather, the mulla Mohammad-Faqih Ārāni ("Ruh'ol-Amin"), were also notable poets.

In spite of his somewhat belated start in cinema, Beyzai is often considered a pioneer of a generation of filmmakers whose works are sometimes described as the Iranian New Wave. His Bashu, the Little Stranger (1986) was voted "Best Iranian Film of all time" in November 1999 by a Persian movie magazine Picture World poll of 150 Iranian critics and professionals. Still, even before the outset of his cinematic career in 1970, he was a leading playwright (as well as theatre historian), so much so that he is often considered the greatest playwright of the Persian language, and holds a reputation as "The Shakespeare of Persia".

Since 2010, Beyzai has lived and taught at Stanford University, United States.

Early years
Beyzaie was born in Tehran, to a poet, anthologist and biographer father and a housewife mother. His father made a living through a legal occupation and was able to attend to his literary interests reasonably.

The young Bahram did not seem very interested in his family legacy, being poetry, which was pursued by his father, uncles and cousins. In high school, the Dar'ol-Fonoun, he wrote two historical plays which went on to become his preferred method of writing.

At the age of 21, he did substantial research on the traditional Persian plays, particularly Ta'zieh, and by 1961 he had already spent a great deal of time studying and researching other ancient Persian and pre-Islamic culture and literature. This in turn led him to studying Eastern theatre and traditional Iranian theatre and arts which would help him formulate a new non-Western identity for Iranian theatre. He also became acquainted with Persian painting.

Career

Playwriting in the 1960s
In 1968, Beyzai was one of the nine founders of the Iranian Writers' Guild, a highly controversial organization in the face of censorship. In 1969, he was invited to teach at the Theater Department of the College of Fine Arts at University of Tehran. He chaired this department from 1972 to 1979. With his readership many prominent authors and artists started teaching at the department and created the most fruitful period in the history of that department.

Beyzaie's groundbreaking A Study on Iranian Theatre (Namayesh dar Iran), published in mid-1960s is still considered the most important text on the history of Iranian theater. Beyzaie is also the first scholar in Iran to publish books on theatre of Japan and theatre of China.

Some of his plays, such as his masterpiece Death of Yazdgerd, have been translated into numerous languages and have been performed around the world. Death of Yazdgerd has been performed in Iran, France, England, India and USA among other countries, and was made into a film of the same name by Beyzai in 1981. Death of Yazdgerd and Kalat Claimed have been translated into English by Manuchehr Anvar.

1970s and the outset of a cinematic career
In 1969, he began his film career by directing the short film Amu Sibilou (Uncle Moustache) followed by "Safar" in 1970. With these films Beyzai is often considered to be a pioneer of the Iranian New Wave, a Persian cinema movement that was started in the late 1960s.

Immediately after, in 1971, he made his first feature film Ragbar (Downpour) which is regarded by critics to this day as one of the most successful Iranian films ever made. The successful film addresses the late Parviz Fannizadeh as its central character and protagonist.

Since then he has produced and directed 8 films including Qaribe va Meh (Stranger and the Fog) (1974), Cherike-ye Tara (Ballad of Tara) (1979), Bashu, the Little Stranger (1986, released in 1989), Shāyad Vaghti digar (Maybe Another Time) (1988) and Mosaferan (Travellers) (1992).

Filmmaking in the 1980s
In 1981, the revolutionary leaders started the Iranian Cultural Revolution, as a result of which Beyzaie among many others was expelled from the university. He continued writing and making films though. His screenplay Ruz-e Vaqe'e (The Fateful Day) was adapted into a film in 1995 and another screenplay was adapted into a film named Fasl-e Panjom (The fifth season) in 1996, whilst he also made four of his finest films. He also edited Ebrahim Hatamikia's Borj-e Minu (Minoo Tower).

1990–present
He married the actress and make-up artist Mozhdeh Shamsai in 1992. After Mosaferan, he failed to get a permit for the production of a number of screenplays. In 1995, he left Iran for Strasbourg at the invitation of the International Parliament of Writers. Soon however he returned and staged The Lady Aoi in Tehran.

In 2001, he made his best-selling film Killing Mad Dogs, after which he managed to stage three plays as well before he left Iran for the United States.

He left Iran in 2010 at the invitation of Stanford University, and has since been the Daryabari Visiting Professor of Iranian Studies, teaching courses in Persian theatre, cinema and mythology. There he has given workshops on the Shahnameh, the history of Iranian performing arts, Iranian as well as Semitic myths, etc. He has also staged several of his plays including his nine-hour Tarabnameh.

Cinematic style

He is known as the most intellectual and conspicuous "author" in Iranian cinema and theater. The main theme of his works is the history and "crisis of identity" which is related to Iranian cultural and mythical symbols and paradigms. He is considered as Iran's most prominent screenwriter in terms of dramatic integrity of his works, many of which have been made into films.

Reception and criticism
Critics have often praised Beyzai above all Persian filmmakers as well as playwrights. He was voted the best Persian filmmaker of all time in 2002, and his Bashu, the Little Stranger was voted the finest Persian film of all time. All the same, his formalism has occasionally raised criticism, even from himself. Ebrahim Golestan, who had previously made objections to Beyzai's style, praised him in a letter in 2017.

Works

Filmography (as director)

 Amū Sibilū (1969 - short)
 Safar (1970 - short - a.k.a. The Journey)
 Ragbār (1972 - a.k.a. Downpour)
 Qaribé va Meh (1974 - a.k.a. The Stranger and the Fog)
 Kalāq (1976 - a.k.a. The Crow or The Raven )
 Charike-ye Tārā (1979 - a.k.a. Ballad of Tara)
 Marg-e Yazdgerd (1982 - a.k.a. Death of Yazdgerd)
 Bashu, the Little Stranger (1986 - a.k.a. Bashu - released 1989)
 Shāyad Vaghti Digar (1988 - a.k.a. Maybe Some Other Time)
 Mosāferan (1992 - a.k.a. Travellers)
 Goft-o-gū bā Bād (1998 - short - a.k.a. Talking with the Wind)
 Sagkoshi (2001 - a.k.a. Killing Mad Dogs)
 Qāli-ye Sokhangū (2006 - short - The Talking Carpet)
 Vaqti Hame Khāb-im (2009 - When We are All Asleep)

Plays

Beyzaie has over 50 published plays, some of which are as follows. These works have occasionally appeared in French, English, German and other translations too.
 "Gorob dar Diari Garib" (Evening in a Strange Land, translation into English by Gisele Kapuscinski)
 "Chahar Sandoogh" (Four Boxes, translation into English by M.R. Ghanoonparvar and John Green)
 "Hashtomin Safar e Sandbad" (Sindbad's Eighth Voyage; Le Huitième voyage de Sindbad, translation into French by Ahmad Kamyabi Mask )
 Ziāfat va Mirās (1967 - a.k.a. Heritage and The Feast)
 Soltān-Mār (1969 - a.k.a. The King Snake)
 Marg-e Yazdgerd (1979 - a.k.a. Death of Yazdgerd)
 Memoirs of the Actor in a Supporting Role (1981)
 Kalat Claimed (1982)
 Kārnāme-ye Bandār Bidakhsh (1997 and 1998)
 Bānū Aoi (The Lady Aoi (Bahram Beyzai production) (1997 and 1998) based on The Lady Aoi by Yukio Mishima)
 Shab-e Hezār-o-yekom (The One Thousand and First Night) (2003)
 Afrā yā Ruz migozarad (2007 - a.k.a. Afra, or the Day Passes)
 Jana and Baladoor (2012 - A Play in Shadows)
 Arash (2013 - A Play Reading)
 Ardaviraf's Report (2015)
 Tarabnameh (2016 - Part one and Part two)
 Crossroads (2009)

Speeches and lectures

Frequent collaborators

Lisar troupe
During the making of Ballad of Tara in 1978, Beyzai and his crew in Lisar Castle started a troupe whose name remained in use until the 2000s: Lisar troupe.

Awards and honors

The prizes, awards and honors he has won are numerous.

2017, D.Litt. honoris causa, University of St Andrews
2014: Bita Prize for Persian Arts
2012 Farhang Foundation Heritage Award

References

Additional sources

External links
Official website
 
Bahram Bayzai's biography on Iran Chamber Society (www.iranchamber.com)
 Speaking with Bahram Bayzai; [Afrā], Day Passes By, in Persian, BBC Persian, Sunday 6 January 2008, .
 A short talk with Bahram Bayzai, the celebrated director of film and theatre, in Persian, Deutsche Welle, Wednesday 26 December 2007: (Main page), (Audio recording of interview — 4 min 9 sec).
 Najmeh Khalili Mahani, Bahram Baizai, Iranian Cinema, Feminism, Art Cinema, Off Screen, 31 January 2003, .
Ebrahim Barzegar, Seljuk Station by Bahram Beyzai
Ebrahim Barzegar, Senmar Sacrificing Session by Bahram Beyzai

 
1938 births
20th-century essayists
21st-century essayists
20th-century dramatists and playwrights
21st-century dramatists and playwrights
Historians of theatre
Iranian children's writers
Iranian dramatists and playwrights
Iranian film directors
Iranian film editors
Iranian film producers
Iranian emigrants to the United States
Iranian essayists
Iranian expatriate academics
Iranian expatriates in the United States
20th-century Iranian historians
Iranian screenwriters
Iranian theatre directors
Iranian translators
Living people
Male essayists
Mythographers
Writers from Tehran
Persian-language film directors
Persian-language writers
Postmodern writers
Stanford University faculty
Academic staff of the University of Tehran
Iranian scenic designers
Shahnameh Researchers
Poets from Tehran